The 2021–22 Florida Atlantic Owls men's basketball team represented Florida Atlantic University in the 2021–22 NCAA Division I men's basketball season. The Owls, led by fourth-year head coach Dusty May, played their home games at FAU Arena in Boca Raton, Florida as members of East Division of Conference USA.

Previous season
The Owls finished the 2020-21 season 13–10, 7–5 in C-USA play to finish in fourth place in East Division. They defeated UTEP in the second round of the C-USA tournament but then lost to Louisiana Tech in the quarterfinals.

Offseason

Departures

Incoming transfers

2021 recruiting class

Roster

Schedule and results

|-
!colspan=12 style=| Exhibition

|-
!colspan=12 style=| Non-conference regular season

|-
!colspan=9 style=| Conference USA regular season

|-
!colspan=9 style=| Conference USA tournament

|-
!colspan=9 style=|CBI

Source

Notes

References

Florida Atlantic Owls men's basketball seasons
Florida Atlantic
Florida Atlantic
Florida Atlantic Owls men's basketball
Florida Atlantic Owls men's basketball